Vila Valério is a municipality located in the Brazilian state of Espírito Santo. Its population was 14,073 (2020) and its area is 464 km².

The municipality contains part of the  Sooretama Biological Reserve, a strictly protected conservation unit created in 1982 when two earlier units were merged.

References

Municipalities in Espírito Santo